Turlock Lake State Recreation Area is a regional park and recreation area at Turlock Reservoir in Stanislaus County, central California, United States.

Geography
It is part of the California State Parks system.

The recreation area features Turlock Lake with its  of shoreline and the surrounding foothill country leased from the Turlock Irrigation District in 1950.

Recreation 

Recreation activities in the park include fishing, swimming, boating, and water skiing in Turlock Lake; picnicking; birdwatching; bicycling; hiking; and camping. There are also boat launch ramps. The day use areas are open from 8:00 AM to sunset.

The park offers visitors an example of the diverse variety of riparian zone native plants that once flourished alongside the rivers across the San Joaquin Valley.

There is a $12 day use fee to enter Turlock Lake State Recreation Area.

See also

Nearby state parks
Great Valley Grasslands State Park
George J. Hatfield State Recreation Area
McConnell State Recreation Area

References

External links 
 Parks.ca.gov: official Turlock Lake State Recreation Area website
Parks.ca.gov: Turlock Lake State Recreation Area Brochure — maps, history, and natural features
The Four Rivers Association — funds and supports educational and resource projects and programs in San Joaquin Valley state parks

California State Recreation Areas
Parks in Stanislaus County, California
Parks in the San Joaquin Valley
Reservoirs in Stanislaus County, California
Tuolumne River
Campgrounds in California
Protected areas established in 1950
1950 establishments in California
Reservoirs in California